Steginoporellidae is a family of bryozoans belonging to the order Cheilostomatida.

Genera:
 Dimorphomicropora  Ducasse & Vigneaux, 1960
 Gaudryanella  Canu, 1907
 Labioporella  Harmer, 1926
 Labiporella
 Menbranipora 
 Reniporella  Guha & Gopikrishna, 2004
 Siphonoporella  Hincks, 1880
 Steginoporella  Smitt, 1873

References

Bryozoan families